Earthling is the third solo studio album by American singer-songwriter Eddie Vedder. The album was released on February 11, 2022, by Republic Records and Seattle Surf.

Critical reception

Earthling received generally positive reviews from critics. At Metacritic, which assigns a normalised rating out of 100 to reviews from critics, the album received an average score of 79, which indicates "generally favorable reviews", based on 15 reviews. In March 2022 the album received a glowing review from Record Collector magazine: "Earthling gives an uplifting sense of the creative energy shared between Eddie Vedder and his keenly empathetic collaborators, distilled into striking, memorable songs, and unified by a fresh, cohesive sound."

Track listing

Personnel
Musicians

 Eddie Vedder – vocals (all tracks), background vocals (1, 3, 4, 6, 9–11), guitar (1, 5, 6, 10, 13), keyboards (1), tenor guitar (3), drums (7), ukelin (8), piano (12), percussion (13)
 Andrew Watt – bass (1–7, 9–13), guitar (1–8, 11–13), keyboards (1, 13), background vocals (3–6, 10), piano (3), percussion (6, 7, 10), string arrangement (7, 12), drums (11), drum machine (12)
 Chad Smith – drums (1–6, 8–10), percussion (3, 5)
 Josh Klinghoffer – guitar (1–5, 7, 9, 10), keyboards (1, 3, 6–9, 12, 13), percussion (1, 2, 9), piano (1–3, 5–7, 9), bass (2, 8); background vocals, organ (5)
 Harper Vedder – background vocals (3) 
 Benmont Tench – Hammond organ (3, 11)
 David Campbell – conductor, string arrangement (7, 12); horn arrangement, strings direction(12)
 Alyssa Park – concert master, violin (7, 12)
 Paula Hochhalter – cello (7, 12) 
 Jacob Braun – cello (7, 12)
 Sara Parkins – violin (7, 12)
 Josefina Vergara – violin (7, 12)
 Tammy Hatwan – violin (7, 12)
 Olivia Vedder – background vocals (10)
 Stevie Wonder – harmonica (10)
 Abe Laboriel Jr. – drums, percussion (11)
 Elton John – vocals, background vocals, piano (11)
 Joshua Ranz – clarinet (12)
 Ringo Starr – drums, percussion (12)
 Steve Kujala – flute (12)
 Dylan Hart – French horn (12)
 Thomas Hooten – piccolo trumpet (12)
 Danny Long – piano (13)
 Edward Severson Jr. – vocals (13)

Technical
 Andrew Watt – production
 Randy Merrill – mastering
 John Burton –additional engineering (2, 11)
 Serban Ghenea – mixing
 Bryce Bordone – mix engineering (1, 2, 4–6, 8–13)
 Paul Lamalfa – engineering
 Marco Sonzini – engineering (1, 2, 4–6, 8–13), engineering assistance (3), additional engineering (7)
 Steve Churchyard – engineering (7, 12)
 Scott Moore – engineering assistance (7, 12)
 Bettie Ross – production coordination (7, 12)
 Suzie Katayama – production coordination (7, 12)

Design
 Eddie Vedder – layout design, typeface
 Joe Spix – layout design, typeface
 Danny Clinch – photography

Charts

Notes

References

2022 albums
Eddie Vedder albums
Republic Records albums
Albums produced by Andrew Watt (record producer)